The Plens is a 5 hectare nature reserve in Desborough in Northamptonshire. It is managed by the Wildlife Trust for Bedfordshire, Cambridgeshire and Northamptonshire.

Former use as a quarry and a railway line have created steep slopes and varied habitats, with grassland, hawthorn scrub, woodland and herbs. Flowers include wild basil, bladder campion, moschatel and bird's-foot-trefoil. There is a diverse range of invertebrates, particularly butterflies.

There is access from Ironwood Avenue.

References

Wildlife Trust for Bedfordshire, Cambridgeshire and Northamptonshire reserves
Desborough